"Narode Makedonski" (in  "Macedonian People") is  folk revival song about the national awakening of the Macedonian people.

Interpretations of the song

The song was interpreted by many pop and folk singers in the Republic of Macedonia. Versions of "Narode makedonski" are performed by Kaliopi for the project "Makedonija Zasekogash" (Macedonian forever) in which old folk songs were interpreted by the icons of the Macedonian pop, Makedonski merak band, Simeon Gugulovski and Biser band among others.

See also
Music of the Republic of Macedonia

Macedonian folk songs

mk:Народе Македонски